Around the World in 80 Days is a period drama adventure television series based on the 1873 Jules Verne novel of the same name, in which, as a bet, Phileas Fogg travels the world in 80 days by train and ship. It was commissioned by the European Alliance, a co-production alliance of France Télévisions, ZDF of Germany, and RAI of Italy, with additional co-production partners of Masterpiece (US) and Be-Films/RTBF (Belgium). It was produced in the UK, France and South Africa, with filming also taking place in Romania. The series first premiered on La Une in Belgium, on 5 December 2021, and later on BBC One in the United Kingdom on 26 December 2021. In November 2021, ahead of the premiere, it was announced the programme had been renewed for a second series.

Premise
The story is about Phileas Fogg making a £20,000 (£2,409,600 in 2022) wager with a snobbish member of the prestigious Reform Club that he can circumnavigate the world in 80 days, joined by his new valet Passepartout and journalist Abigail Fix. Although the story is fictional, real-life people such as Adolphe Thiers, Jane Digby and Bass Reeves are portrayed interacting with the fictional characters.

Cast

Main
David Tennant as Phileas Fogg
Ibrahim Koma as Jean Passepartout
Leonie Benesch as Abigail Fix Fortescue

Recurring
Jason Watkins as Bernard Fortescue, Abigail's father and Fogg's friend
Peter Sullivan as Nyle Bellamy, Fogg's rival
Richard Wilson as Grayson, Fogg's butler
Leon Clingman as Roberts, maitre d'hôtel at Reform Club
Anthony Flanagan as Thomas Kneedling, Bellamy's henchman
Jeff Rawle as Hughes, Bank manager in London
 as Samuel Fallentin, a Reform Club member

Episodic

Episode 1 

 Loic Djani as Gérard, Passpartout's brother
  as Monsieur Lome, inventor of a balloon
 Alain Guillo as Adolphe Thiers, President of France
 Christine Brücher as Sister Catherine, a French nun
 Karina Ziana Gherasim as Urchin girl in Paris
 Stefan Burlacu as Urchin boy in Paris
  as Chief of Police in Paris
 Tache Florescu as Senior Police officer in Paris
 Masali Baduza as Edith, employee at the Reform club
 Luyanda Kabanyane as sous-chef at Reform club
 Paul Snodgrass as Ostler, employee at the Daily Telegraph

Episode 2 

 Giovanni Scifoni as Niccolò Moretti, an Italian industrialist
 Cristian De Vergori as Alberto Moretti, Niccolò's son
  as Marco, conductor of the train Turin - Brindisi
  as train driver
 Doru Catanescu as train stoker
 Cristian Popa as Fazi, an Italian man travelling in 1st class
 Aida Economu as Eva, Fazi's wife
  as an Italian mother travelling in 3rd class
 Riccardo Blanda as Italian mother's son #1
 Costin Toma as Italian mother's son #2

Episode 3 

Lindsay Duncan as Jane Digby, an Englishwoman
Faical Elkihel as Sheik Medjuel El Mezjuel Mezrab, Jane's husband
Raees Mohammed as Arab Trader
Florin Galan as steward on the ship Brindisi-Aden
Ambrose Uren as Muhammad Nuwas, Fogg's guide across the Empty Quarter
Hein de Vries as waiter at Al Hudaydah's café

Episode 4 

 Shivaani Ghai as Aouda, an Indian woman
Rizelle Januk as Samanaz, Aouda's older daughter
Kiroshan Naidoo as Arjan, Samanaz' future husband
Reeya Gangen as Noori, Aouda's younger daughter
Charlie Hamblett as Lieutenant Bathurst, a British officer in the Indian Army

Episode 5 

Patrick Kennedy as Sir Henry Rowbotham, British Governor in Hong Kong
Victoria Smurfit as Lady Clemency Rowbotham, Sir Henry's wife
 as Jiang Liei, Passpartout's former boss in Hong Kong
Walter van Dyk as Lord Crossley, chief magistrate of Hong Kong
Bart Fouche as Peter Donaldson, chief of Hong Kong's police
Nicky Rebelo as Anderson, Sir Henry's butler
 as Mrs. Hildreth, Lady Clemency's friend
Sven Ruygrok as bank clerk
Sean Cameron Michael as chief bank manager
Sandra Pow Chong as Tanka Woman
Bryan Jardine as officer in the ship Hong Kong - Yokohama

Episode 6 

 Brett Williams as Foreign Office officer in London
 Robert Coutts as Singing Reform Club Member #1
 Evan Hengst as Singing Reform Club Member #2
 Gordon van der Spuy as Singing Reform Club Member #3

Episode 7 

Gary Beadle as Bass Reeves, US Deputy Marshal
John Light as Ambrose Abernathy, ex confederate colonel and Ku Klux Klan member
Elena Saurel as Sally, the stagecoach's driver
Eduard Bartha as the second stage coach's driver
Oliver J. Hemborough as Robinson, a Ku Klux Klan member
Paul Budeanu as Davis, a Ku Klux Klan member
 as barman in Battle Mountain
Robert G. Slade as telegraph Operator in Battle Mountain
Andrew Luke as station master in Battle Mountain
Michael Elkin as bailiff in London
Reza Diako as New York Times Journalist

Episode 8 

Dolly Wells as Estella, Fogg's former love
Dominic Carter as the customs officer in Liverpool
Ty Tennant as the gang leader in New York
 as officer in the ship New York - Liverpool
James Dutton as Henry, the arrogant man on the ship
George Birsman as second arrogant man on the ship
Dorothea Myer-Bennett as arrogant woman on the ship

Episodes

Production
Filming locations included South Africa and Romania. Filming was suspended in March 2020 due to the COVID-19 pandemic, but resumed on 1 October that year. In November 2021, ahead of the premiere, it was announced the series had been renewed for a second series. The main title score is by Hans Zimmer and Christian Lundberg.

Release
Around the World in 80 Days first premiered in Belgium on 5 December 2021. ZDF released the complete series online in Germany on 11 December 2021, with an on-air release from 21 December to 23 December. The series premiered on France 2 in France on 20 December 2021, and in Norway on NRKs streaming website on 25 December 2021, with linear broadcasting the following days during Boxing Week. In the United Kingdom the series premiered on BBC One on 26 December 2021, and on Masterpiece for PBS in the United States on 2 January 2022.

Reception
The review aggregator website Rotten Tomatoes reported a 79% approval rating with an average rating of 6.4/10, based on 14 reviews. The website's critical consensus reads, "Around the World in 80 Days sometimes stumbles when it tries to add modern resonance to Jules Verne's globetrotting epic, but the core cast make for terrific travel companions." Metacritic gave the series a weighted average score of 61 out of 100 based on reviews from 16 critics, indicating "generally favorable reviews". Rebecca Nicholson of The Guardian gave it four out five stars, praising its cast, production values and escapism, but found the first episode slow in its setup. The Telegraph gave it three out of five stars. Daniel Fienberg of The Hollywood Reporter felt the plot did not justify eight episodes, but praised Tennant's performance.

Ed Cumming of The Independent gave it two stars, feeling the budget did not do the epic scope of the novel justice. James Delingpole in The Spectator also gave a negative review of the series, complaining about its attempts to speak to contemporary political issues (though the original novel was also inspired by topical subjects of its own day, such as rapid technological progress and the growing travel industry). He criticized the updated characteristics of Fix and Passepartout, as well as inconsistencies such as Passepartout's lack of upset at the death of his brother.

References

External links

2020s Australian drama television series
2020s British drama television series
2020s French drama television series
2020s German drama television series
2020s Italian drama television series
2021 Australian television series debuts
2021 British television series debuts
2021 French television series debuts
2021 German television series debuts
2021 Italian television series debuts
Australian television series
British adventure television series
English-language television shows
French adventure television series
German adventure television series
Italian adventure television series
Television productions suspended due to the COVID-19 pandemic
Television series set in the 1870s
Television shows based on Around the World in Eighty Days
Television shows filmed in Romania
Television shows filmed in South Africa
Television shows set in England